Bárbara Castro (born 8 September 1975) is a Chilean former professional tennis player.

Biography
Castro trained at the Santa Rosa de Las Condes in Santiago and was later based in Spain during her career.

From 1992 to 2000, Castro featured in a total of 36 Fed Cup ties for Chile. Her doubles partnership with Paula Cabezas resulted in 15 wins, which is a national record. She has a younger sister, Valentina, who also represented Chile in Fed Cup tennis.

Castro partnered with Paula Cabezas in the women's doubles event at the 1996 Atlanta Olympics, where they lost their first round match to Hungary's Virág Csurgó and Andrea Temesvári in three sets. With the same partner, Castro won a silver medal for Chile at the 1999 Pan American Games in Winnipeg.

ITF finals

Singles (0–1)

Doubles (3–8)

References

External links
 
 
 

1975 births
Living people
Chilean female tennis players
Olympic tennis players of Chile
Tennis players at the 1996 Summer Olympics
Tennis players at the 1999 Pan American Games
Pan American Games silver medalists for Chile
Pan American Games medalists in tennis
South American Games medalists in tennis
South American Games gold medalists for Chile
South American Games bronze medalists for Chile
Competitors at the 1994 South American Games
Competitors at the 1998 South American Games
Medalists at the 1999 Pan American Games
20th-century Chilean women